CHBN-FM is a Top 40/CHR radio station based in Edmonton, Alberta, Canada. The station, which is owned by Rogers Sports & Media, operates at 91.7 MHz with an ERP of 100 kW. CHBN's studios are located on Gateway Boulevard in Edmonton, while its transmitter is located near Anthony Henday Drive in eastern Edmonton. CHBN is branded as Kiss 91.7.

The station was first launched on February 17, 2005 under the joint ownership of CHUM Limited and Milestone Radio, the parent company of CFXJ-FM in Toronto as 91.7 The Bounce. At launch, CHBN aired a rhythmic top 40 before shifting to the current Top 40/CHR format. CHBN was acquired by CTVglobemedia in 2007 when it acquired the assets of CHUM Limited while the Citytv stations were sold to Rogers Media, who in turn acquired the station from CTVgm in 2010.

As of Feb 28, 2021, CHBN is the 10th-most-listened-to radio station in the Edmonton market according to a PPM data report released by Numeris.

History

CHBN signed on the air as 91.7 The Bounce on February 17, 2005. When the station first signed on, the station aired a rhythmic top 40 format, but moved to the current Top 40/CHR format in December 2005. They became the only top 40 station in the Edmonton market when CKRA (96X) shifted their format to play a hot adult contemporary format in August 2005, and then later to country four months later. After this surprise development, The Bounce shifted to more mainstream pop music.

Every year in October, in an event called "Bras Across the Bridge", for Breast Cancer Awareness Month, CHBN collects bras from listeners, donating $1 to the Canadian Breast Cancer Foundation for every bra collected. At the end of the month, they then tie all the bras together and span the string of bras across the High Level Bridge as many times as they can.

At the time of their launch, CHBN was jointly owned by CHUM Limited and Milestone Radio. In June 2007, all of CHUM's assets, including its share of CHBN, were sold to CTVglobemedia. On June 23, 2010, it was announced that CHBN would be sold to Rogers (which also owns Edmonton's World FM and Sonic), along with its sister station in London, Ontario, CHST-FM, pending CRTC approval. The acquisition also saw the reunion of CHBN with its sister station CKEM-DT for the first time since 2007.

When CFMG-FM flipped from AC to CHR/Top 40 as Virgin Radio, it marked the first three-station FM top 40 battle in Edmonton as of February 2011 (the other competitor being CJNW). Since the launch of Virgin, CHBN has been playing fewer commercials, as seen with the introduction of Commercial Free Mondays, and playing more currents and higher-charting songs than its competition. CHBN will continue to report on Mediabase and Nielsen BDS' Canadian contemporary hit radio panel.

On February 24, 2017, at 10 a.m., CHBN re-branded as KiSS 91.7, adopting the KiSS brand used by other Rogers CHR and hot AC stations and launching with a 91-hour commercial-free marathon.

Bounce Showdown
The Bounce has held seven singing contests, named the "Bounce Showdown", it has been called Canada's most successful talent competition. The winner of the Bounce Showdown is signed to record two songs with a record label, and their songs played on the Bounce. The past winners have been:
 2005: Kreesha Turner
 2006: Shiloh
 2007: Nathan Brown
 2008: Quanteisha Benjamin
 2009: Justin Blais
 2010 (June): Beatrice "Love" Gouchey
 2010 (November): Bryan Finlay

References

External links

 

HBN
HBN
HBN
Radio stations established in 2005
2005 establishments in Alberta